Evgeny "Zhenya" Vladimirovich Sokolovsky (born 7 November 1978 in Odessa) is a Ukrainian professional racing driver, team manager and businessman. In 2021, Sokolovskiy won the Belgian touring car championship Belcar Endurance.

Sokolovsky is owner and manager of MotoGP/IDM team Vector Racing, who wins 2011 the Internationale Deutsche Motorradmeisterschaft in the 600cc Supersport class. He himself drove in the "Vector 24-7 GP Racing" team until 2012, when he changed to touring car racing after a break in 2018 and started in the NASCAR Whelen Euro Series in 2020.

Early years 
Evgeny Sokolovsky grew up in the Ukrainian Soviet Republic in Odessa. Evgeny came to motorsport very early through his father, the Ukrainian rally driver Wladmir Sokolovsky, and started in junior races at the age of 8.

From 1995 to 2000 Evgeny studied at the Odessa National Economics University (now part of the Odessa National Polytechnic University) and graduated with a master's degree (Dyplom Magistra) as a commercial IT specialist.

Motorcycle racing 

From 2003 to 2009 Evgeny Sokolovsky drove in the Supersport 600 in national championships in Russia and Ukraine.

From 2009 to 2011 he started in the German Yamaha R6 Cup. In 2011, missions in the WorldSBK and in the German DMV circuit racing championship were added. During the 2011 IDM final run at the Hockenheimring he crashed hard.

In the 2012 season he started again in the IDM Suppersport and WorldSBK UEM Coppa dei Due Paesi Trophy, but ended his two-wheeler career at the end of the season.

Team owner and manager 

As team owner, Sokolovsky led the motorcycle racing team Vector Racing together with team manager Andrey Gavrilov.

Since 2001 the team has participated in various different championships, up to European and world championship races. In 2006 the team then entered the World SBK Motorcycle World Championship. 2008 Vladimir Ivanov took 2nd place in the IDM Supersport on a Yamaha YZF-R6 for his team.

In 2009 Vector Racing started their season with Vladimir Leonov in the MotoGP up to 250cc and in 2010 additionally started in the newly created Moto-2 class.

In the 2011 season, Vector Racing returned to the IDM and won the International German Motorcycle Championship (IDM) with the driver Jesco Günther in the Supersport class.

After the successful 2011 season, Vector Racing Team decided to launch two teams, each with two drivers, for 2012 in the IDM Supersport: Vector Bily KM Racing and Vector 24-7 GP Racing. However, the team could no longer build on the successes of previous years.

Touring car racing 

After a break as an active driver, Evgeny Sokolovsky switched to touring car racing in 2018. He entered the European oval racing series LMV8 (Late Model V8) and achieved second place in the ASCAR class in his debut year.

In 2019 he switched to a new vehicle in the LMV8-NASCAR class and managed to improve after getting used to it. In the final race, Sokolovsky was involved in a high-speed crash and the emergency vehicle was completely destroyed, Sokolovsky could be recovered from the vehicle unharmed.

In 2020 Evgeny Sokolovsky starts for Marko Stipp Motorsport in the EuroNASCAR Pro class of the NASCAR Whelen Euro Series and in the Challenger Trophy.

Because of the coronavirus pandemic, the races of the NASCAR Whelen Euro Series were suspended in March 2020 and the EuroNASCAR Esports Series was established. Results of the virtual series will also have impact on the real-life championship. Evgeny Sokolovsky started in the esports championship as well with his team Marko Stipp Motorsport.

Since the second event in 2020, Sokolovsky has also started permanently in the NASCAR 2 class.

In 2021, the Belgian Touring Car Championship, the Belcar Endurance Championship, was added to EuroNASCAR. Here Evgeny Sokolovsky became Belgian champions with Joël Uylenbroeck and former Belgian cycling champion Jurgen Van Den Broeck on the TCR-Audi RS3 LMS with Team QSR-Racing.

For October 2022 Sokolovsky and Ivan Pelkin are confirmed by the Ukrainian national team for the GT-Classes of the 2022 FIA Motorsport Games.

Racing record

LMV8-Series

EuroNASCAR

EuroNASCAR Pro

EuroNASCAR 2

EuroNASCAR eSports Series

Belcar Endurance Championship: Touring Car Division

Personal life 
Evgeny Sokolovsky is married and lives in Düsseldorf, Germany.

As the managing partner, he heads the AutoSL dealerships in Neuss and in the Classic Remise Düsseldorf.

External links 

Vector Racing
AutoSL GmbH

References 

NASCAR drivers
Ukrainian racing drivers
Ukrainian motorcycle racers
German motorcycle racers
German esports players
Motorcycle racing team owners
Sportspeople from Düsseldorf
Sportspeople from Odesa
Living people
1978 births
DAMC 05 people
24H Series drivers
Odesa National Economics University alumni
Nürburgring 24 Hours drivers
FIA Motorsport Games drivers